Midrash Shmuel may refer to:

Midrash Shmuel (aggadah), an aggadic midrash on the Books of Samuel
Midrash Shmuel Yeshiva, an English-speaking yeshiva in Jerusalem
Midrash Shmuel, a sixteenth century work by Rabbi Samuel ben Isaac de Uçeda